Diesel multiple units and railcars are trains, usually with passenger accommodation, that do not require a locomotive. Railcars can be single cars, while in multiple units cars are marshalled together with a driving position either end. , 23 percent of the rail passenger cars used on Network Rail are part of a diesel multiple unit.

Some prototype steam-powered railcars appeared in the mid-19th century, and at the start of the 20th century over 100 were built. Diesel motors became powerful enough for railway use after World War I, and the Great Western Railway built several single cars and multiple units in the 1930s, which lasted until the 1960s. A 1952 report recommended the trialling of lightweight diesel multiple units, followed by plans in the 1955 Modernisation Plan for up to 4,600 diesel railcars. Most of these had a mechanical transmission, but the Southern Region had experience of DC electric multiple units, and diesel electric multiple units were introduced.

In 1960 the Blue Pullman service was introduced using high-speed trainset consisting of coaches sandwiched between two power cars. Initially this train was considered to be a diesel electric multiple unit, but for operational reasons the classification was changed and the power cars became identified as Class 43 locomotives.

Origins

Steam railcars

From 1847–1849 William Bridges Adams built a number of steam railcars, vehicles with a steam engine for propulsion and passenger accommodation. These were the Express or Lilliputian, Fairfield and Enfield. Kitson and Company of Leeds built Ariel's Girdle in 1851. By 1908 the GWR had purchased or built 99 railcars (or railmotors as they called them), but from 1917 began converting them into autocoaches for use on push-pull trains with a steam locomotive, as these were more reliable and were able to haul additional carriages or goods wagons. Between 1905 and 1911 the Lancashire and Yorkshire Railway (L&YR) purchased or built seventeen steam rail cars, some running into the 1940s.

After trials in 1924, the London & North Western Railway bought three types of steam railcars from Sentinel-Cammell and Claytons.  a reconstructed GWR 1908 steam railmotor is operational, based at Didcot Railway Centre and an GWR autotrailer is being restored.

Petrol and Diesel railcars

An early petrol railcar was the 1903 Petrol Electric Autocar built by the North Eastern Railway. In 1914 the London and North Western Railway commissioned a  petrol-electric railcar, although this was converted into a driving trailer in 1924. After World War I more powerful diesel engines were available and in 1928 the London Midland & Scottish Railway (LMS) commissioned a four-car diesel-electric multiple unit using a  Beardmore engine, similar to that used on the airship R101, placed in a power car that had been used on the Lancashire and Yorkshire Railway's electrified line from Bury to Holcombe Brook. In the early 1930s Armstrong Whitworth built three railcars for the LMS, LNER and Southern Railway. These had a  Sulzer engine driving two GEC traction motors and could seat 60 passengers, able to pull trailers or run in multiple. English Electric built a prototype railcar called Bluebird with a  engine. In 1938 the LMS built a 3-car articulated multiple unit at Derby, with two  motors driving the axles using a torque converter, controlled using an electro-pneumatic system.

Between 1933 and 1942 the GWR received 38 diesel power cars. The first stream-lined car used one AEC  engine, seating 69 passengers. This was followed by three cars with two engines for a cross country service between Birmingham and Cardiff, then suburban passenger cars and a parcels car. No 18 was designed to pull horse boxes and with electro-pneumatic multiple unit control, followed by twenty more to a similar design. The last four were built with only one driving compartment so as to operate in pairs with a trailer between them.  a GWR diesel railcar is preserved in running order at the Didcot Railway Centre, one is a static exhibit at the Museum of the Great Western Railway and one is being restored at the Kent and East Sussex Railway.

First generation DMUs
The railways were placed under Government control two days before war was declared on 3 September 1939. After the war, the railways were in a poor financial state, with a maintenance backlog. Government control was relinquished when the Transport Act 1947 nationalised most of the railways in the United Kingdom and control passed to the Railway Executive of the British Transport Commission, who inherited 37 diesel railcars. A 1952 report recommended lightweight diesel multiple unit trials, and a memo to the Board suggested diesel railcars could replace push-pull steam trains on 168 routes. After fuel rationing ended, the first order was placed in November 1952 for 21 x 2-car sets built at Derby Works, which became known as Derby lightweights.
More were to follow until this class numbered 66 motor cars and 55 trailers. In 1952, British United Traction made numerous 4-wheeled single car railbuses.
 As part of the 1955 Modernisation Plan of British Railways, plans were made for up to 4,600 diesel railcars. The British Railway workshops at Derby and Swindon did not have the necessary capacity, so private carriage builders such as Metropolitan-Cammell, Gloucester, Birmingham and Cravens received orders. Not all units could work in multiple with each other, but the blue square coupling code covered 84 percent of the cars built, using a four-speed gearbox with gear selection controlled pneumatically. Internally the units could be classified as suburban with doors for each seating bay and 3+2 seating in second class, such as Class 118, low density with two doors per vehicle side, 3+2 bus style seating in second class, such as Class 114 and Intercity with interiors to the same standard as locomotive hauled stock, such as Class 124.

, about 250 vehicles survive in preservation, and various vehicles (mainly 101s and 121/122s) survive in departmental use.

Diesel electric multiple units
Diesel electric multiple units were introduced on the Southern Region, where there was experience of DC electric multiple units. The Hastings line had special restrictions due to tunnels on the line and special narrow stock was needed. The six car sets had two power cars, each having  diesel generator driving two standard Southern Region  traction motors. Introduction had been planned for June 1957, but special services were run early following a fire at Cannon Street in London. When the full timetable started 12-car trains divided en route into non-stop and stopping portions. Elsewhere the standard loading gauge could be used and the trailer vehicles were similar to contemporary Southern Region electric multiple units.

The Blue Pullman was a class of high-speed luxury diesel-electric multiple units introduced in 1960. Six coach sets were used on the London Midland Region, all first class with at seat service served from two kitchen cars. The two power cars had diesel engines connected to a  generators, both supplying four  traction motors. The Western Region units had two additional second class coaches. All cars were double glazed and air-conditioned, the first on British Railways.

It had been calculated that  was needed, and after the Paxman Valenta engine with an output of  became available, a prototype train with two Class 41 power cars and standard Mark 3 coaches was built. In 1973 this prototype achieved , and production InterCity 125 trains entered service in October 1976, becoming the first  diesel train service in the world. Initially the rolling stock was considered to be diesel-electric multiple units, with coaches sandwiched between two power cars.

Two prototype Class 210 DMUs were introduced in 1981, based on the Mark 3 coach bodyshell with a diesel engine mounted at the end of one of the driving cars. It was not a success due to complexity and cost.

Second Generation DMUs
The Pacer series grew out of a single car prototype developed for export that used a body designed by Leyland Motors with bus components mounted on a 4-wheeled high-speed freight underframe. Two car production units were introduced into Britain from 1981 to 1987.

A prototype Sprinter was built in 1983, based on the Mark 3 bodyshell design. The British Rail Engineering Limited Class 150 with a high density layout, followed by the 150/2 that had gangways between units. The Leyland Class 155 and Metro-Cammell Class 156 were built in 1987–89 and most Class 155 units were split into two single car units in 1991–92, (becoming Class 153), a new compact cab being fitted to the inner ends by Hunslet. The Class 158 was built for long distance routes with air conditioning and a quiet interior. Upgraded versions of the Class 158, the Class 159 were built for Network SouthEast for use on the West of England Main Line between Exeter and London Waterloo.

The Networker Turbo was built for Network SouthEast in the early 1990s. The Class 165 is a two or three coach unit used on local services on Chiltern and Thames routes out of London and was followed by the  Class 166 for long distance services.

Privatisation

Train manufacturer British Rail Engineering Limited was privatised in 1989, and between 1994 and 1997 the rest of British Rail was privatised. Ownership of the track and infrastructure passed to Railtrack on 1 April 1994; afterwards passenger operations were franchised to individual private-sector operators and the freight services sold outright. Rolling stock is owned by ROSCOs and leased to the train operators; competitive tenders are invited from manufacturers for new trains. During the privatisation process, there was a gap of nearly three years during which no new rolling stock orders were placed. The first new order placed was in June 1996 for four Class 168 Clubman DMUs for Chiltern Railways. These were a development of the Networker Turbo design already in use by Chiltern and other operators.

The Bombardier Turbostar was an evolution of the Class 168 and purchased by Anglia Railways, Central Trains, Chiltern Railways, Hull Trains, London Midland, London Overground Rail Operations, ScotRail, South West Trains and Southern. As at September 2020, they are operated by Abellio ScotRail, CrossCountry, Govia Thameslink Railway, Northern Trains, Transport for Wales Rail and West Midlands Trains.

Alstom Coradia units were built in between 1999–2001.

The Siemens Desiro Class 185 is in service on TransPennine Express services. The 51 strong fleet was built between 2005–2006 for First TransPennine Express.

The Bombardier Voyager family is a series of high speed DEMUs. Virgin CrossCountry were looking to replace a mixture of life expired loco-hauled trains and mid-life HSTs and have tilt for use on the West Coast Main Line. The result was the non-tilt Class 220 Voyager and tilting Class 221 Super Voyager. As at September 2020, they are operated by Avanti West Coast and CrossCountry. Midland Mainline and Hull Trains ordered the Class 222 Meridian non-tilt version. As at September 2020, all are operated by East Midlands Railway.

As part of the Intercity Express Programme bi-mode Class 800 and 802s entered service on the Great Western Main Line in 2017 and on the East Coast Main Line in 2019.

Future
Diesel CAF Civity DMUs have been ordered by Northern (Class 195), West Midlands Trains (Class 196) and Transport for Wales Rail. Abellio Greater Anglia have ordered bi-mode Stadler Flirts.

Bi-mode Class 769s are being converted from Class 319s for Great Western Railway, Northern and Transport for Wales Rail. Diesel-electric and diesel-battery-electric Class 230s are being converted from London Underground D78 Stock for Transport for Wales Rail and West Midlands Trains.

Refuelling
Train manufacturer in the UK and other rail reliant countries that use DMU rail cars must be refuelled at depot stops with diesel. The refuelling process is usually carried out by a qualified operator with knowledge of rail refuelling. The train driver would usually level the train up to the platform to meet the refuelling pipes assigned at measured distances according to the length of the DMU and the refill nozzles. A Rail Refuelling Flyte Coupler is used to connect the DMU to the fuel line. It is a screw in connection with a safety dry break mechanism to stop accidental leaks. The flow of fuel needs to high volume but low pressure to ensure the fuel does not overfill. Usually there is a float arm similar to a toilet cistern that cuts off the refuelling once a predefined level is reached, however if the pressure is too high, this can cause the train tank to overfill and leak fuel.

References

Bibliography

  Archived at railwaysarchive.co.uk. Retrieved 17 September 2012.
 
  Online preview available at books.google.co.uk. Retrieved 20 September 2012.